Zalakaros  is a town in Zala County, Hungary.

Zalakaros is famous for its thermal spring baths.  It gained its fame in 1967, when prospective oil drilling struck a nearly 96 °C (205 °F) source at a depth of 1000 metres.

Twin towns – sister cities

Zalakaros is twinned with:
 Asperhofen, Austria

 Puchheim, Germany
 Olesno, Poland

Gallery

References

External links

Official website 
Zalakaros at funiq.hu 

Populated places in Zala County
Thermal baths in Hungary